The Adelaide United W-League 2010 season was Adelaide United's third season in the W-League.

Technical staff

Players

Squad

Transfers

In

Out

Squad statistics

Last updated 20 November 2010

Regular season

Standings

Fixtures
Adelaide United played 10 games during the 2010–11 W-League season:

Leading scorers
No player scored more than once during the season.

References

External links
 Official club website

2010-11

2010–11 W-League (Australia) by team